Vishala is a king in Hinduism, featured in the Ramayana. He is the son of Ikshvaku and his queen, Alambusha. He is said to have built a city called Viśālā, near which Ahalya was transformed into stone. He had a son named Hemachandra.

The name of Vishala is also mentioned in one of the Puranas as well as the Mahabharata.

References

Characters in the Ramayana
Hindu mythology
Characters in the Mahabharata